Clayton Magleby Christensen (April 6, 1952January 23, 2020) was an American academic and business consultant who developed the theory of "disruptive innovation", which has been called the most influential business idea of the early 21st century. Christensen introduced "disruption" in his 1997 book The Innovator's Dilemma, and it led The Economist to term him "the most influential management thinker of his time."  He served as the Kim B. Clark Professor of Business Administration at the Harvard Business School (HBS), and was also a leader and writer in the Church of Jesus Christ of Latter-day Saints (LDS Church). One of the founders of the Jobs to Be Done development methodology.

Christensen was also a co-founder of Rose Park Advisors, a venture capital firm, and Innosight, a management consulting and investment firm specializing in innovation.

Early life and education 
Clayton Christensen was born on April 6, 1952, in Salt Lake City, Utah, the second of eight children born to Robert M. Christensen (1926–1976) and his wife, Verda Mae Christensen (née Fuller; 1922–2004). He grew up in the Rose Park neighborhood of Salt Lake City and attended West High School, where he was student body president. Christensen and his siblings were raised as members of the LDS Church.

After graduating from high school in 1970, Christensen was accepted to Harvard University, Yale University, and Brigham Young University (BYU). He "decided to make the decision a matter of prayer" and felt a "clear impression" to attend BYU, which had awarded him a full scholarship. Christensen majored in economics, and was classmates in his first-year economics course with future U.S. presidential candidate Mitt Romney and future Harvard Business School dean Kim B. Clark.  While at BYU, he took a two-year leave of absence from 1971 to 1973 to serve as a volunteer full-time missionary for the LDS Church.  He was assigned to serve in South Korea and became a fluent speaker of Korean. Christensen returned to BYU after completing his missionary service, and in 1975 graduated with an Honors B.A. summa cum laude in economics.

After graduating from BYU, Christensen won a Rhodes Scholarship and spent two years studying applied econometrics at Oxford University's Queen's College, receiving an M.Phil. in 1977. While at Oxford, Christensen was a member of the men's basketball team, winning back-to-back British University Sports Federation championships in 1975 and 1976 and the English Basketball Association's national championship for non-league teams in 1977. Christensen then returned to the United States to attend the Harvard Business School, receiving an MBA with high distinction in 1979.

Career 
After receiving his MBA in 1979, Christensen began working for Boston Consulting Group (BCG) as a consultant and project manager. In 1982, he was named a White House Fellow and took a one-year leave of absence from BCG to work in Washington, D.C. as an assistant to the U.S. Secretary of Transportation, serving under both Drew Lewis and Elizabeth Dole.  In 1984, he and several professors from Massachusetts Institute of Technology founded an advanced ceramics company called Ceramics Process Systems Corporation (now known as CPS Technologies).  Christensen served as its president and CEO through the late 1980s, then decided to leave the company and become a university professor.  He returned to Harvard for doctoral study in business, receiving a Doctor of Business Administration degree in 1992.  After completing his doctorate, Christensen joined the Harvard Business School's faculty and set a record by achieving the rank of "full" professor in only six years.

In 2000, he founded Innosight LLC, a consulting and training firm. In 2005, together with his colleagues at Innosight, he launched Innosight Ventures, a venture firm focused on investing in South Asia, Southeast Asia, and East Asia. In 2007, he co-founded Rose Park Advisors LLC (named after the neighborhood in Salt Lake City where he grew up), an investment company that applies his research as an investment strategy.

He served on the board of directors of Tata Consultancy Services (NSE: TCS), Franklin Covey (NYSE: FC), and the Becket Fund for Religious Liberty. He also served for a time on the editorial board of the Deseret News.

At HBS, he taught an elective course he designed called "Building and Sustaining a Successful Enterprise", which teaches how to build and manage an enduring, successful company or transform an existing organization, and also  in many of the school's  executive education programs. Christensen was awarded a full professorship with tenure in 1998, and held eight honorary doctorates and an honorary chaired professorship at the National Tsinghua University in Taiwan.

Christensen was the best-selling author of ten books, including his seminal work The Innovator's Dilemma (1997), which received the Global Business Book Award for the best business book of the year. One of the main concepts depicted in this book is also his most disseminated and famous one: disruptive innovation. The concept has been growing in interest over time since 2004, according to Google Trends data. However, due to constant misinterpretation, Christensen often wrote articles trying to explain the concept even further. Some of his other books are focused on specific industries and discuss social issues such as education and health care.  Disrupting Class (2008) looks at the root causes of why schools struggle and offers solutions, while The Innovator's Prescription (2009) examines how to fix the American healthcare system.  The latter two books have received numerous awards as the best books on education and health care in their respective years of publication.  The Innovator's Prescription was also awarded the 2010 James A. Hamilton Award, by the College of Healthcare Executives.

In 2017, Christensen predicted that “50 percent of the 4,000 colleges and universities in the U.S. will be bankrupt in 10 to 15 years.”

Personal life 
Christensen and his wife Christine (née Quinn) married in 1976.  They had three sons, Matthew, Michael, and Spencer, and two daughters, Ann and Catherine. Their eldest son, Matthew Christensen (b. 1977), was a member of Duke University's 2001 National Championship basketball team.

As a member of the LDS Church, Christensen served from 1971 to 1973 as a missionary in Korea and spoke fluent Korean. He served in several leadership positions in the church, including as an area seventy from 2002 to 2009, a counselor in the presidency of the Massachusetts Boston Mission, and as a bishop. His book, The Power of Everyday Missionaries, was a leading work in the LDS Church on how all people could be involved in sharing the gospel no matter their position in the church. He was also a moving force behind the creation of For All The Saints, a book by Kristen Smith Dayley on the history of the LDS Church in New England, published in 2012 to which Christensen wrote the foreword.

In February 2010, Christensen was diagnosed with follicular lymphoma, and in July 2010 he had an ischemic stroke that damaged his speech and required him to undergo speech therapy. In 2011, Christensen published two books: The Innovative University and The Innovator’s DNA (Harvard Business Press). Christensen died from complications of leukemia on January 23, 2020, aged 67.

Honors and awards
 In 2011, Forbes called him "one of the most influential business theorists of the last 50 years" in a cover story.
 In both 2011 and 2013 he was ranked number 1 in the Thinkers 50, biannually awarded  and is considered the world's most prestigious ranking of management thinkers.
 In 2017 he was ranked number 3 in the Thinkers 50.
 2014 Herbert Simon Award
 In 2015, he was honored with an Edison Achievement Award for his commitment to innovation throughout his career.
 2015 Brigham Young University Distinguished Service Award

Bibliography

Journal articles
 
 
 
 
 
 
 
 Christensen, Clayton M.; Dillon, Karen; Hall, Taddy; Duncan, David (September 2016), "Know your customer's Job To Be Done", Harvard Business Review
 Christensen, Clayton M.; Bartman, Tom; van Bever, Derek (September 2016), "The Hard Truth about Business Model Innovation", MIT Sloan Management Review

Books 
 
 
 
 
 
 
 
 
 
 
Christensen, Clayton M.; Ojomo, Efosa; Dillon, Karen (2019), The Prosperity Paradox: How Innovation Can Lift Nations out of Poverty, New York, New York, USA: HarperBusiness, .

References

External links 
 
 Official Homepage
 Christensen et al. publication list
 Interview on NPR's On Point - "Clayton Christensen’s Prescription For Health Care", April 14, 2011 (audio)
 

1952 births
20th-century Mormon missionaries
American business theorists
American business writers
American Rhodes Scholars
Area seventies (LDS Church)
Boston Consulting Group people
Brigham Young University alumni
Harvard Business School alumni
Harvard Business School faculty
2020 deaths
American Mormon missionaries in South Korea
Writers from Salt Lake City
American leaders of the Church of Jesus Christ of Latter-day Saints
Latter Day Saints from Utah
Latter Day Saints from Massachusetts
Business educators